Alekos Alexandrakis (27 November 1928 – 8 November 2005) was a famous Greek actor. He was known for his theatrical work as well as work in film and television. He died of lung cancer.

He also directed two films in the early 1960s.

Filmography

Film

Television

Television series (as a guest star)

Movies (as a director)

References

External links
 

1928 births
2005 deaths
Male actors from Athens
Greek male film actors
Greek male stage actors
Greek male television actors
Deaths from lung cancer in Greece